Julia Gray Stowers (born March 18, 1982) is an American former competition swimmer and Olympic gold medalist.  At the 2000 Summer Olympics in Sydney, Australia, Stowers earned a gold medal by swimming for the winning U.S. team in the preliminary heats of the women's 4×200-meter freestyle relay.

After graduating with a bachelor's degree in sociology from the University of Tennessee, Stowers attended the University of Memphis to pursue a J.D. degree. She is now a public defender.

See also
 List of Olympic medalists in swimming (women)
 List of University of Tennessee people

References

External links
 
 
  Julia Stowers – University of Tennessee athlete profile at Utsports.com

1982 births
Living people
American female freestyle swimmers
Olympic gold medalists for the United States in swimming
Sportspeople from Knoxville, Tennessee
Swimmers at the 1999 Pan American Games
Swimmers at the 2000 Summer Olympics
Tennessee Volunteers women's swimmers
Medalists at the 2000 Summer Olympics
Pan American Games silver medalists for the United States
Pan American Games medalists in swimming
Medalists at the 1999 Pan American Games
Public defenders